Scabricola albina is a species of sea snail, a marine gastropod mollusk in the family Mitridae, the miters or miter snails.

Description
The length of the shell varies between 25 mm and 35 mm.

Distribution
This species occurs in the Pacific Ocean and off the Philippines.

References

 Poppe G.T. & Tagaro S.P. (2008). Mitridae. pp. 330–417, in: G.T. Poppe (ed.), Philippine marine mollusks, volume 2. Hackenheim: ConchBooks. 848 pp.

External links
 Gastropods.com: Mitra (Mitra) albina

Mitridae
Gastropods described in 1853